Jason Shannon Acuña (born May 16, 1973), better known by his stage name Wee Man, is an American stunt performer, television personality, professional skateboarder, and actor. He is one of the stars of the reality comedy series Jackass and the host of Fox Sports Net's skateboarding show 54321. Acuña has achondroplasia, a form of dwarfism.

Life and career

Born in Pisa, Italy, Acuña grew up in Torrance, California, and attended North High School. He is of Mexican and German descent. He was the subscription manager for the skateboard magazine Big Brother. His association with that magazine led him to become involved with the Jackass television series in 2000. Acuña's Jackass antics include skating as an Oompa-Loompa, kicking himself in the head, dressing as a king while rolling Johnny Knoxville down a staircase in a red carpet, and doing deep-knee bends while holding basketball star Shaquille O'Neal on his back. A recurring gag involves Preston Lacy asking someone to help him with his bags, only to have Acuña pop out, causing Lacy to chase him.

In 2007, Acuña starred in the reality TV series Armed and Famous and in July 2007, Acuña appeared on TV as a host of MTV's Scarred Live.

Acuña appeared on the first season of NBC's Celebrity Circus. In the fourth week of competition, he became the first contestant to receive a perfect score (a 10-point average). Acuña ended the season in third place.

Acuña is an investor in the Chronic Tacos chain of fast casual Mexican restaurants. His first franchise location opened in 2010 in Redondo Beach, California. After a few years of trying to make this location a success, Acuña closed this location permanently and in February 2018, he opened a Chronic Tacos franchise in Long Beach, California.

In 2012, Acuña starred in the direct-to-video holiday film Elf-Man as the title character. This was his first role in a family-friendly feature film.

Filmography

Films

Television

DVDs

Video games

Music videos

Web series

References

External links 
 
 Official website
 

1973 births
American people of German descent
American male actors of Mexican descent
Actors with dwarfism
Italian emigrants to the United States
Participants in American reality television series
American male film actors
American male television actors
American stunt performers
Jackass (TV series)
Hispanic and Latino American male actors
People from Pisa
Living people